Christiano François (born July 17, 1993) is a Haitian professional footballer who plays as a winger for the Rio Grande Valley FC in the USL Championship and for the Haiti national team.

Career

Early career
François came to the United States following the 2010 Haiti earthquake, playing prep soccer for two years at Saint Benedict's Preparatory School in Newark, New Jersey. He enrolled in the University of Maryland's Maryland English Institute and formed a close bond with fellow Haitian Widner Saint-Cyr. Following a freshman season where he scored 5 goals in 24 games for the Terrapins, François was forced to redshirt his sophomore year due to academic reasons.

D.C. United
After two years at Maryland, François decided to leave college early and sign a contract with Major League Soccer.  He was claimed by D.C. United via the Waiver Draft on January 24, 2014. On March 25, François was loaned to USL Pro affiliate club Richmond Kickers  He made his professional debut on April 5 in a 3-1 victory over the Pittsburgh Riverhounds.

On August 8, 2014; he was recalled from Richmond and released by D.C. United.

On January 21, 2015 he signed with SC Vila Real as a forward and right-wing midfielder.

In August 2015 he signed with Felgueiras 1932.

FC Motown
During 2016, François made appearances with New Jersey amateur side FC Motown.

Rochester Rhinos
On March 21, 2017, he signed with USL side Rochester Rhinos.

Ottawa Fury
Following a season with Pittsburgh Riverhounds, François signed with Ottawa Fury FC of the USL Championship on December 3, 2018.

Miami FC
On January 18, 2021, François signed with USL Championship side Miami FC.

El Paso Locomotive FC
François joined El Paso Locomotive in the USL Championship's Western Conference on 8 February 2022. He made 26 league appearances, scoring one goal and assisting another, before departing the club following the expiry of his contract.

Rio Grande Valley FC Toros
On January 27, 2023, François signed with Rio Grande Valley FC.

International career
He made his debut for Haiti national football team on 7 September 2019 in a CONCACAF Nations League game against Curaçao, he replaced Derrick Etienne in the 78th minute.

References

External links

Maryland Terrapins bio

desportivotransmontano.com
 

1993 births
Living people
Association football forwards
Haitian footballers
Haitian expatriate footballers
Expatriate soccer players in the United States
Haitian expatriate sportspeople in the United States
Expatriate footballers in Portugal
Haitian expatriate sportspeople in Portugal
Expatriate soccer players in Canada
Haitian expatriate sportspeople in Canada
Maryland Terrapins men's soccer players
Central Jersey Spartans players
Baltimore Bohemians players
D.C. United players
Richmond Kickers players
F.C. Felgueiras 1932 players
FC Motown players
Rochester New York FC players
Pittsburgh Riverhounds SC players
Ottawa Fury FC players
Reno 1868 FC players
Miami FC players
El Paso Locomotive FC players
Rio Grande Valley FC Toros players
USL League Two players
Campeonato de Portugal (league) players
USL Championship players
Haiti international footballers
Undrafted Major League Soccer players